Eugnosta plusiana is a species of moth of the  family Tortricidae. It is found in Turkmenistan and Russia.

References

Moths described in 1899
Eugnosta